The 1935 Tschammerpokal Final decided the winner of the 1935 Tschammerpokal, the first season of Germany's knockout football cup competition. It was played on 8 December 1935 at the Rheinstadion in Düsseldorf. 1. FC Nürnberg won the match 2–0 against Schalke 04 to claim the first national cup title.

Route to the final
The Tschammerpokal began the final stage with 63 teams in a single-elimination knockout cup competition. There were a total of five rounds leading up to the final. Teams were drawn against each other, and the winner after 90 minutes would advance. If still tied, 30 minutes of extra time was played. If the score was still level, a replay would take place at the original away team's stadium. If still level after 90 minutes, 30 minutes of extra time was played. If the score was still level, a second replay would take place at the original home team's stadium. If still level after 90 minutes, 30 minutes of extra time was played. If the score was still level, a drawing of lots would decide who would advance to the next round.

Note: In all results below, the score of the finalist is given first (H: home; A: away; N: neutral).

Match

Details

References

External links
 Match report at kicker.de 
 Match report at WorldFootball.net
 Match report at Fussballdaten.de 

1. FC Nürnberg matches
FC Schalke 04 matches
Tschammerpokal Final
1935
December 1935 sports events
Sports competitions in Düsseldorf
20th century in Düsseldorf